Louisiana's 38th State Senate district is one of 39 districts in the Louisiana State Senate. It has been represented by Republican Barry Milligan since 2020, following Milligan's 2019 defeat of Democratic incumbent John Milkovich.

Geography
District 38 covers all of DeSoto Parish and southern parts of Caddo Parish  in Ark-La-Tex, including the towns of Greenwood, Keithville, Stonewall, and Mansfield, as well as a small portion of southern Shreveport. 

The district is located entirely within Louisiana's 4th congressional district, and overlaps with the 1st, 3rd, 4th, 5th, 6th, 7th, and 23rd districts of the Louisiana House of Representatives.

Recent election results
Louisiana uses a jungle primary system. If no candidate receives 50% in the first round of voting, when all candidates appear on the same ballot regardless of party, the top-two finishers advance to a runoff election.

2019

2015

2011

Federal and statewide results in District 38

References

Louisiana State Senate districts
Caddo Parish, Louisiana
DeSoto Parish, Louisiana